Nikola Korabov (7 December 1928 – 10 November 2016) was a Bulgarian film director and screenwriter. He directed thirteen films between 1956 and 1999. His 1962 film Tyutyun was entered into the 1963 Cannes Film Festival. His 1965 film Bull was entered into the 4th Moscow International Film Festival. His 1971 film Wrathful Journey was entered into the 7th Moscow International Film Festival. He died on 10 November 2016.

Filmography
 Dimitrovgradtsy (1956)
 Malkata (1959)
 Tyutyun (1962)
 Bull (1965)
 Svoboda ili smart (1969)
 Gnevno patuvane (1971)
 Ivan Kondarev (1974)
 Yuliya Vrevskaya (1978)
 Az ne zhiveya edin zhivot (1981)
 Orisiya (1983)
 Kopnezhi po beliya pat (1987)
 Poverie za beliya vyatar (1990)
 Magia (1999)

References

External links

1928 births
2016 deaths
Bulgarian film directors
Bulgarian screenwriters
Male screenwriters
People from Ruse, Bulgaria